Guy Manning, born in Leeds, Yorkshire, England is an English multi-instrumentalist and singer, best known for his own album releases (Manning), the DAMANEK band albums and for his membership of progressive rock bands Parallel or 90 Degrees, The Tangent and The United Progressive Fraternity (UPF).

Biography
Manning was the founding member of two Leeds based bands in the 1980s, Let's Eat! and Bailey's Return. He was also recruited in 1987 to be the keyboards player (joining Julie King) in art-rock band Through The Looking Glass. This band split up a year later and a more pop based offshoot, KingGlass, emerged which continued for a further year.

Manning and local keyboardist/vocalist Andy Tillison had an early unsigned band called Gold Frankincense & Disk Drive. This band's final line-up included David Albone on drums and a guest spot from Van der Graaf Generator organ player Hugh Banton. One piece by this line-up, "A Gap in the Night", was later included on Parallel or 90 Degrees' The Corner of My Room before being reworked for the second album by The Tangent.

Tillison and Manning also recorded the album No More Travelling Chess at this time, which consisted of a set of covers of material by Peter Hammill plus a couple of original pieces. This album was first released as a mail order cassette item (before an augmented and remastered version was eventually released by Cyclops Records in 2001 under the band name of Parallel or 90 Degrees).

Tillison and Manning then formed the new band, Parallel or 90 Degrees, with Sam Baine also on keyboards.

Manning has gone on to release his own albums, five for the Cyclops label and three more for USA label, ProgRock Records. With a further change of record label, the 2007 release, Songs From The Bilston House was released on the Festival Music (F2) label based in the UK (as have all subsequent Manning album releases).

Tillison played on several of these albums, while special guests have included Martin Orford (IQ), Ian 'Walter' Fairbairn (Hedgehog Pie & Jack the Lad), Stephen Dundon (Molly Bloom), Leon Camfield (Tinyfish), Marek Arnold (Seven Steps to the Green Door, Toxic Smile & Cyril), Chloe Herington (Knifeworld), Hugh Whittaker (The Housemartins), John Young (Lifesigns, John Young Band, Asia, Scorpions, Bonnie Tyler & more), Phideaux and Angela Gordon (Mostly Autumn).

The ProgRock Records album covers and also the later "Margaret's Children" (as the sequel to "Anser's Tree") were created by notable graphics artist, Ed Unitsky.

Manning and Tillison also teamed up as fictional Italian band La Voce Del Vento to provide two long pieces for the Colossus Project Discs (The Spaghetti Epics #1 and #2).

Manning has also provided an unreleased track "Top Of The Mountain" for KINECTIONS, the US ProgDay festival support album.

In 2016, Manning assembled Marek Arnold, Dan Mash & Sean Timms to form a new band, Damanek. Damanek have released 3 albums to date on the GEP (Giant Electric Pea) Label.

In March 2022, Guy Manning announced a new collaborative project "The Patchwork Alliance" made up of himself as principal composer/lyricist plus other musical friends

Manning (the Band)
In April 2008, news appeared on the Classic Rock Society website stating that Manning had recruited a new band consisting of Kevin Currie, Kris Hudson-Lee, Julie King, Danny Rhodes and Phil Wilkes. The band (minus Julie King) debuted at the Classic Rock Society's Tribute to Rob Leighton concert in June 2008. Drummer Danny Rhodes left soon after and was replaced by former colleague, David Albone in 2009. The band performed at the prestigious Rites of Spring Festival in Gettysburg, PA on 1 May 2010 debuting material from their album 'Charlestown' which was released in October 2010.

The MANNING live band was put on hold and retired in January 2014.

Guy Manning and Damanek 
The new band (DAMANEK) was formally announced at the start of 2016. Led by Guy Manning, Marek Arnold, Dan Mash (all of whom had worked together in UPF) plus Sean Timms (ex-Unitopia and now with his own new band, Southern Empire).

Other guest contributors have been Nick Magnus, Brody Thomas Green (Southern Empire), Cam Blokland (Southern Empire), Antonio Vittozzi (ex-Soul Secret), DavidB, Phideaux, Luke Machin (Maschine, Francis Dunnery, The Tangent, Kiama), Jonathan Barrett (The Tangent), Nick Sinclair, Ulf Reinhardt (Seven Steps to the Green Door), Tim Irrgang (UPF), Stephen Dundon (Molly Bloom), Julie King, Chris Catling, Kevin Currie, the Sanducci Horns, Raf Azaria (UPF), Tzan Niko, Amanda Timms, The Gospel Collective & Jones Commentary.

Recording for the debut album "On Track", was started in February 2016. The band debuted live on 2 October 2016 at Summers End Festival with the line-up announced 09/09/2016 of Guy Manning, Marek Arnold, Dan Mash, Sean Timms with Special Guests: Luke Machin and Henry Rogers. On 14 March 2017, it was announced that the band had signed to top UK Independent label Giant Electric Pea (GEP) and that "On Track" would be released in May 2017. In mid 2018, it was announced that the follow up album "In Flight" would be released by GEP on 5 October 2018. A short tour of Europe and UK followed in November/December with joint headliners Southern Empire. Dan Mash left the lineup after the tour.

The third album "Making Shore" started into recording in May 2020, though it was severely delayed by the COVID pandemic.
It was released on 13/01/2023 (again on the GEP label)

Guy Manning and Cyril 
Damanek colleague Marek Arnold asked Manning to compose the majority of lyrics for Cyril's 2016 "Paralyzed" album. Following the critical success of this album, Guy was asked to provide all the lyrics and the concept narrative for 2019's "The Way Through". Manning also provides a cameo spoken dialogue on the recording.
In 2022, Cyril released a new album,  "Amenti's Coin - A Secret Place Part 2", Guy once again provided the english lyrics and updates to the narrative storyline, plus a cameo spoken vocal.

Guy Manning and The United Progressive Fraternity (UPF) 
On 31 March 2014, a new band was formally announced, led by Mark 'Truey' Trueack, Matt Williams, Tim Irrgang and David Hopgood (ex-members of Unitopia) plus involving Guy Manning, Marek Arnold and Dan Mash (all from Damanek). The debut album Fall in Love With the World was released and included guest appearances by Jon Anderson, Steve Hackett, Steve Unruh, Ian Ritchie, Jonathan Barrett and Claire Vezina, among others. The band did a short promotional tour of UK/Europe in Autumn 2014 including that year's Summers End (X) Festival, Guy left the line-up shortly after that

Guy Manning and The Tangent
In 2001/2, plans for a solo album by Andy Tillison transformed into the first release by The Tangent, The Music That Died Alone (2003). This initial line-up included Manning and Sam Baine plus Roine Stolt, Jonas Reingold and Zoltan Csorsz from The Flower Kings, and David Jackson from Van der Graaf Generator. Other later Tangent members have included Theo Travis, Jaime Salazar, Krister Jonsson, Jakko Jakszyk, Jonathan Barrett, Luke Machin, Daniel Mash and Tony Latham.

On 11 May 2010, a statement appeared on the Guy Manning website indicating that he would no longer be partaking in any future Tangent activities, although he has provided Acoustic Guitar [cameo only] for 2013's "Le Sacre du Travail".

In all, Manning has played on six official studio, two unofficial studio and one live album by The Tangent. See main article on The Tangent.

Discography / contributions

Guy Manning / Manning
  Tall Stories For Small Children (1999) as Guy Manning & (Remaster 2010) as Manning
  The Cure (2000 & Remaster 2010)
  Cascade (2001 & 2008)
  The Ragged Curtain (2002 & Reissue 2013)
  The View From My Window (2003)
  A Matter Of Life & Death (The Journal Of Abel Mann) (2004)
  One Small Step... (2005 & Remaster 2010)
  Anser's Tree (2006)
  Songs From The Bilston House (2007 & Reissue 2010)
  Number Ten (2009 & Reissue 2013)
  Charlestown (2010)
  Margaret's Children (2011)
  Akoustik (2012)
  The Root, The Leaf & The Bone (2013)
  Akoustik #2 (2014)

Damanek
 On Track (2017)
 In Flight (2018)
 Making Shore (2023)

Cyril
 Paralyzed (2016) - [Wrote lyrics for majority of album]
 The Way Through (2019) - [Wrote english lyrics for the whole album plus created the concept/narrative / Cameo Spoken Word performance]
 Amenti's Coin - A Secret Place Part 2 (2022) - [Wrote English lyrics for the whole album plus updated the concept/narrative / Cameo Spoken Word performance]

Seven Steps to the Green Door
 Fetish (2015) - [Wrote lyric for track "Set in Motion"]

Mark Rowen
 Radiance (2018) - [Provided synth on track "Lure Of The Siren"]

The United Progressive Fraternity (UPF)
  Fall In Love With The World (2014)

La Voce Del Vento
 The Spaghetti Epic #1 (2005)
 The Spaghetti Epic #2 (2006)

The Tangent

Studio albums
 The Music That Died Alone (2003)
 The World That We Drive Through (2004)
 A Place in the Queue (2006)
 Not as Good as the Book (2008)
 Down and Out in Paris and London (2009)
 A Place on the Shelf (2010)
 Le Sacre Du Travail (2013) [Cameo Only]
 L'Etagère Du Travail (2013)

Live albums
 Going Off on One (2007)

Parallel Or 90 Degrees
 The Time Capsule (1998)
 No More Travelling Chess (1999)
 A Can Of Worms (2009)

References

 Eclectic Moonlight interview
 2003 interview
 2004 interview
 2008 interview
 2010 interview
 Manning Album Discography
 Damanek Album Discography

External links
 The Official DAMANEK Website
 The Official Guy Manning Website
 Southern Empire Website
 Seven Steps to the Green Door Website
 Cyril Website
 The Official United Progressive Fraternity Website
 Maschine Website
 Soul Secret Website
 Nick Magnus Website	
 2010 interview with Guy Manning
 Interviews/Reviews/Radio Shows listed at Damanek Website
 Damanek signs to GEP

English songwriters
English male singers
Musicians from Leeds
1957 births
Living people
English rock guitarists
Progressive rock musicians
The Tangent members
English male guitarists
British male songwriters